Rhiwbina railway station is a suburban railway station serving Rhiwbina, Cardiff, Wales. Passenger services are provided by Transport for Wales as part of the Valley Lines network. The line is served by the Sprinter classes of DMUs.

History
It was opened by the Cardiff Railway in 1911, and was a two-track, dual platform station. Services have previously included a service from Coryton to Cardiff Bay.

Improvements to the Coryton Line are scheduled to occur from 2020 onwards, with Rhiwbina potentially becoming a part-electrified two-track station with two platforms, in mid-2021, under new proposals made by the South Wales Metro Scheme.

Facilities
The station, previously a halt, has a small shelter and a card-only ticket machine. It is accessible from the Rhiwbina Garden Village side, behind the library, as well as from Caedelyn Park via a newly renovated footbridge.

Services
From Monday to Saturday daytimes, there is a half-hourly service at 18 minutes, and 48 minutes past the hour, southbound to Cardiff Central and onwards to Radyr on the City Line. Trains serve Rhiwbina in the northbound direction towards Coryton at 6 minutes past, and 36 minutes past the hour. Evening services are reduced to an hourly service in each direction but there is no Sunday service as of June 2020, with rescheduling due under the South Wales Metro Scheme.

See also
List of railway stations in Cardiff

References

External links

Railway stations in Cardiff
DfT Category F2 stations
Former Cardiff Railway stations
Railway stations in Great Britain opened in 1911
Railway stations served by Transport for Wales Rail